Mayra Yaratzeth Huerta Hernández (born September 14, 1970 in Morelia) is a beach volleyball player from Mexico, who won the bronze medal in the women's beach team competition at the 1999 Pan American Games in Winnipeg, Manitoba, Canada, partnering Laura Almaral. She represented her native country at the 1996 Summer Olympics in Atlanta, Georgia.

References

External links 
 
 

1970 births
Living people
Mexican beach volleyball players
Women's beach volleyball players
Beach volleyball players at the 1996 Summer Olympics
Olympic beach volleyball players of Mexico
Beach volleyball players at the 1999 Pan American Games
Sportspeople from Morelia
Pan American Games bronze medalists for Mexico
Pan American Games medalists in volleyball
Central American and Caribbean Games gold medalists for Mexico
Competitors at the 1998 Central American and Caribbean Games
Central American and Caribbean Games medalists in beach volleyball
Medalists at the 1999 Pan American Games
20th-century Mexican women